Joaquim Amado Quevedo (10 May 1946 – 24 January 2022) was a Brazilian politician.

A member of the Social Democratic Party, he served as mayor of Tatuí from 1983 to 1987 and again from 1993 to 1996. He died of cancer on 24 January 2022, at the age of 75.

References

1946 births
2022 deaths
Social Democratic Party (Brazil, 2011) politicians
Mayors of places in Brazil
People from Tatuí